Base ten blocks, also known as multibase arithmetic blocks (MAB) or Dienes blocks (after their creator, mathematician and educationalist Zoltán Pál Dienes), are a mathematical manipulative used by students to learn basic mathematical concepts including addition, subtraction, number sense, place value and counting. The student can manipulate the blocks in different ways to express numbers and patterns. Generally, the three-dimensional blocks are made of a solid material such as plastic or wood and come in four sizes to indicate their individual place value: Units (ones place), Longs (tens place), Flats (hundreds place) and Blocks (thousands place). There are also computer programs available that simulate base ten blocks.

Use in mathematics instruction
Base ten blocks are popular in elementary school mathematics instruction, especially with topics that students struggle with such as multiplication. They are frequently used in the classroom by teachers to model concepts, as well as by students to reinforce their own understanding of said concepts. Physically manipulating objects is an important technique used in learning basic mathematic principles, particularly at the early stages of cognitive development. Studies have shown that their use, like that of most mathematical manipulatives, decreases as students move into higher grades.

See also 
 Mathematical manipulative
 Base 10
 Number sense
 Mathematics education

References

External links 
Educational and Supplemental Materials for K-12
 http://nlvm.usu.edu/en/nav/frames_asid_152_g_1_t_1.html?from=topic_t_1.html
 http://www.mathsolutions.com/documents/0-941355-57-8_L.pdf
 https://web.archive.org/web/20090903152814/
 http://www.susancanthony.com:80/Resources/base10ideas.html
 Using Base Ten Blocks to Understand Multiplication

Mathematical manipulatives